Mind your business may refer to:

 "Mind your business", a motto imprinted on the Fugio cent of 1787 (the first general circulation coin of U.S. currency)
 Mind Your Business, a 1928 film by director Benjamin Stoloff
 "Mind Your Business", a song on the 2006 album Elai Lineendunge by Sunny Boy
 "Mind Your Business", a 1992 song by the hip-hop group Organized Rhyme

See also
 Mind your own business (disambiguation)